Yang Cheng (born 11 October 1985) is a Chinese football goalkeeper who currently plays for Hebei China Fortune in the Chinese Super League.

Club career
Born in Tianjin, Yang originally started his career with the Tianjin Locomotive youth team. He would then move to the Shandong Luneng youth team in 2000 where he graduated through the various youth squads. He would eventually graduate to the senior team and for several seasons was used as an understudy and would later make his league debut on November 4, 2004 against Shenyang Ginde in a 4-1 win. After that game he retained his place within the team and despite his age Yang would start in the 2004 Chinese FA Cup final, which the club won 2-1 against Sichuan Guancheng. The following season Yang established himself as the first choice goalkeeper throughout the season and while Shandong finished the season in third Li Leilei was brought into the squad at the beginning of the 2006 league season to add more experience towards the team.

On 27 February 2015, he transferred to China League One side Hebei China Fortune. In his debut season with the club Yang would immediately establish himself as the club's first choice goalkeeper and went on to win promotion to the Chinese Super League in his first season with the club.

International career
Under head coach Eckhard Krautzun Yang Cheng would be the first choice goalkeeper for the U-20 Chinese  football team in the 2005 FIFA World Youth Championship held in the Netherlands. While he would aid China to the knock out stages of the competition Yang Cheng would find himself at fault for China's defeat to Germany when he conceded a penalty that saw Germany win 3-2.

Career statistics 
Statistics accurate as of match played 31 December 2020.

Honours

Club
Shandong Luneng
Chinese Super League: 2006, 2008, 2010
Chinese FA Cup: 2004, 2006, 2014
Chinese Super League Cup: 2004

References

External links
Biography and news at sina.com
Player stats at football-lineups website
Player profile at Shandong Luneng club website 
Player stats at Sohu.com 
 

1985 births
Living people
Association football goalkeepers
Chinese footballers
Footballers from Tianjin
Shandong Taishan F.C. players
Hebei F.C. players
Chinese Super League players
China League One players